Zhilya is a rural locality (a village) in Yugo-Kamskoye Rural Settlement, Permsky District, Perm Krai, Russia. The population was 2 as of 2010.

Geography 
Zhilya is located 76 km southwest of Perm (the district's administrative centre) by road. Novy is the nearest rural locality.

References 

Rural localities in Permsky District